"Bottle Living" and "Hold On" are songs by Depeche Mode vocalist Dave Gahan, released on 27 October 2003 as a double A-side single from his debut studio album, Paper Monsters (2003), serving as the album's third and final single. The single release of "Hold On" is a "radio mix" and has a slightly faster pace and more prominent rhythm track than that of the more placid album version of the song.

The UK limited-edition CD maxi single, contains a remixed version of "Hidden Houses", another album track, as a B-side.

Track listings
UK CD single (CDMUTE310)
"Bottle Living" (album version) – 3:32
"Hold On" (radio mix) – 3:52
"Bottle Living" (Tomcraft vocal mix) – 7:47

UK limited-edition CD single (LCDMUTE310)
"Bottle Living" (Machine Head lyric mix) – 6:04
"Bottle Living" (T. Raumschmiere vocal mix) – 5:19
"Hidden Houses" (Alexander Kowalski remix) – 5:15

UK DVD single (DVDMUTE310)
"Bottle Living" (video) – 3:32
"Bottle Living" (Tomcraft dub mix) – 7:48
"Bottle Living" (Machine Head synth mix) – 6:29

US CD maxi single (42671-2)
"Bottle Living" (album version) – 3:32
"Bottle Living" (Tomcraft vocal mix) – 7:47
"Bottle Living" (Machine Head lyric mix) – 6:04
"Bottle Living" (T. Raumschmiere vocal mix) – 5:19
"Hidden Houses" (Alexander Kowalski remix) – 5:15
"Hold On" (radio mix) – 3:52

German limited-edition 3-inch CD single (CDMUTE310P)
"Bottle Living" (album version) – 3:32
"Hold On" (radio mix) – 3:52

Charts

Release history

External links
 Single information from the official Dave Gahan website
 AllMusic review

2003 singles
2003 songs
Dave Gahan songs
Mute Records singles
Reprise Records singles
Songs written by Dave Gahan
Songs written by Knox Chandler